Stade Omar Bongo is a multi-purpose stadium in Libreville, Gabon. It is currently used mostly for football matches. It serves as the home ground of FC 105 Libreville. The stadium has a capacity of 41,000 and is named after Omar Bongo, who was President of Gabon from 1967 to 2009.

References

External links

Fotos at cafe.daum.net/stade
Photo at worldstadiums.com
Photos at fussballtempel.net

Omar
Gabon
Sport in Libreville
Buildings and structures in Libreville
Multi-purpose stadiums